The 1930 Indiana Hoosiers football team represented Indiana University as a member the Big Ten Conference during the 1930 college football season. Led by fifth-year head coach Harlan Page, the Hoosiers compiled an overall record of 2–5–1, with a mark of 1–3 in conference play, placing seventh. The Hoosiers played their home games at Memorial Stadium in Bloomington, Indiana.

Schedule

References

Indiana
Indiana Hoosiers football seasons
Indiana Hoosiers football